Evergreen, also known as Evergreen Valley, is a large district of San Jose, California, located in East San Jose.

History

Evergreen was originally part of Rancho Yerba Buena, a Mexican-era rancho grant given to Antonio Chaboya, a member of a prominent, local Californio family, by Governor José Figueroa. The Chaboya family played an important role in the development of the area and is memorialized in Evergreen through various place names, such as Chaboya Middle School, Chaboya Park, Chaboya Road, and the Chaboya neighborhood of Evergreen.

Evergreen was the site of gliding experiments in 1911 by John J. Montgomery, an important figure in pioneering aeronautics. In his honor the local community has established John J. Montgomery Elementary School, Montgomery Park (City of San Jose).

Montgomery's last glider, named "The Evergreen", after the San Jose district, was restored by the Smithsonian Institution and is currently on display at the San Diego Air and Space Museum in San Diego, California.

Geography

Evergreen is located in East San Jose. The Alum Rock district is located north of Evergreen and Silver Creek Valley (sometimes considered part of Evergreen) is located south of Evergreen. To the east of Evergreen is the Diablo Range.

Waterways in Evergreen include Thompson Creek and Silver Creek.

Education

The area is served by Evergreen Elementary School District and East Side Union High School District. Evergreen Valley High School with an API score of 10 in 2016 and Silver Creek High School with an API score of 9 in 2016 are the primary comprehensive high schools to serve Evergreen. 

Evergreen Valley College is at the base of the foothills of the Diablo Range. 

Libraries
Evergreen area is served by two libraries as part of San Jose Public Library System: 
Evergreen Branch Library on Aborn Road 
Evergreen Village Square Branch Library at Evergreen Village Square

Evergreen Valley College also has its Library and Educational Technology Center.

Landmarks

Evergreen Village Square
Lake Cunningham
Raging Waters San Jose
Eastridge 
Evergreen Valley College
Gurdwara Sahib of San Jose

Plazas and parks

Evergreen Village Square
Lake Cunningham
Joseph D. Grant County Park
Boggini Park
Canyon Creek Park, 
Montgomery Hill Park, 
Groesbeck Hill Park, 
Fowler Creek Park
Arcadia Ballpark
Brigadoon Park

Gallery

References

External links 

Visit San José - Evergreen
City of San Jose, Council District 8

Neighborhoods in San Jose, California